Mohamed Adel (born 11 September 1992), is an Egyptian footballer who plays for Egyptian Premier League club Al Ittihad as a defensive midfielder.

References

External links
Bio at kooora.com

1992 births
Living people
Sportspeople from Alexandria
Egyptian footballers
Association football defenders
Egyptian Premier League players
Al Ittihad Alexandria Club players